Rudolf Viertl (12 November 1902 – 9 December 1981) was an Austrian football forward who played for Austria in the 1934 FIFA World Cup. He also played for FK Austria Wien.

References

1902 births
1981 deaths
Austrian footballers
Austria international footballers
Association football forwards
1. Simmeringer SC players
FK Austria Wien players
1934 FIFA World Cup players